The Lost: A Search for Six of Six Million is a non-fiction memoir by Daniel Mendelsohn, published in September 2006, which has received critical acclaim as a new perspective on Holocaust remembrance. It was awarded the National Book Critics Circle Award, the National Jewish Book Award, and the Prix Médicis in France. It was shortlisted for the Duff Cooper History Prize in the UK.  An international bestseller, The Lost has been translated into numerous languages, including French, German, Dutch, Italian, Spanish, Portuguese, Greek, German, Romanian, Turkish, Norwegian, and Hebrew.

The Lost tells of Mendelsohn's world-wide travels in search of details about the lives and fates of a maternal great-uncle,  Samuel (Shmiel) Jäger, his wife, Ester, and their four daughters who lived in Bolechow and were killed during the Nazi occupation. According to the author, "My book is about trying to find out exactly, specifically, what happened to those people."

In writing The Lost, Mendelsohn notes a debt to Marcel Proust, telling Salon.com, "Clearly, the book is in some large sense about the possibility of recovering the past, so it's automatically a Proustian book."

Sources and Reviews
New York Times Book Review front-page review by Ron Rosenbaum
Elie Wiesel Review in The Washington Post
New York Review of Books Review by Charles Simic (October 5, 2006)
The Nation review
Charlotte News-Observer review
Newsday review
On Point radio/ WBUR Interview (September 28, 2006)
NPR story/ Fresh Air interview (October 18, 2006)
Pittsburgh Tribune review
Salon.com Interview (December 14, 2006)
Times of London profile
LIRE: Entretien avec Daniel Mendelsohn

External links
The Lost video - Conversation with Daniel Mendelsohn, at publisher Harpercollins
CNN interview transcript - July 13, 2002 interview about the original New York Times magazine article
DanielMendelsohn.com

References

Personal accounts of the Holocaust
2006 non-fiction books
National Book Critics Circle Award-winning works